The Church of St Peter and St Paul is a church in Barkestone-le-Vale, Leicestershire, England. It is a Grade II* listed building.

History

The church is mostly 14th century but with some 15th century additions. Several of the windows are built in the Gothic style. In 1840, the nave, north aisle, clerestory, tower and chancel were rebuilt, and the south aisle built. The whole church was then restored 17 years later.

The congregation belongs to the Vale of Belvoir group.

References

Barkestone-le-Vale
Barkestone-le-Vale
Redmile